De stille Oceaan is a 1984 Belgian-Dutch drama film directed by Digna Sinke. It was entered into the 34th Berlin International Film Festival.

Cast
 Josée Ruiter as Marian Winters
 Andrea Domburg as Emilia Winters
 Josse De Pauw as Emil Winters
 Monique Kramer as Rita Winters
 Julien Schoenaerts as Frits Rosmeyer
 Rafi Nahual as Enrique
 Luis Granados as Miguel
 Cor Witschge as Portier
 Jan Moonen as Hotelreceptionist
 Johan Leysen as Jan Verstraete
 Pim Lambeau as Hospita
 Peter Tuinman as Agent
 Jaap van Donselaar as T.V.-redacteur
 Reinout Bussemaker as Begeleider Tehuis
 Elsje de Wijn as Receptioniste
 Gerrard Verhage as Journalist

References

External links

1984 films
Belgian drama films
Dutch drama films
1980s Dutch-language films
1984 drama films
Films directed by Digna Sinke